Astrocaryum urostachys is a species of flowering plant in the family Arecaceae. It is found only in Ecuador. Its natural habitat is subtropical or tropical moist lowland forests.

References

urostachys
Flora of Ecuador
Least concern plants
Taxonomy articles created by Polbot
Taxa named by Max Burret